Rykene or Rygene is a village located along the river Nidelva in Agder county, Norway. The village is primarily located in Arendal municipality, but a small portion of the village lies across the river in the neighboring municipality of Grimstad. Historically, the village grew up due to its close proximity to forests as the timber was floated down river to the sawmills in Rykene. The village sits at the junction of Norwegian County Road 407 and Norwegian County Road 408.

An area of  lies in Grimstad with 22 residents while the rest of the village lies in Arendal on the north side of the river.

The village sits along the river Nidelva, at a waterfall called Rygene. The village used to have the same name as the waterfall, but the spelling of the village was later changed to Rykene. The name comes from the Old Norse name: rjúkandi which means "smoking", possibly referring to the mist at the base of the waterfall. The name has the same etymology as the municipality of Rjukan.

The local sports team is Rygene IL. The historic Øyestad Church is located just outside of the village.

Media gallery

References

Villages in Agder
Arendal
Grimstad